Nicanor Sagarduy Gonzalo (previously Nicanor Trapero Gonzalo), commonly known as Canito (18 March 1931 – 24 June 1998), was a Spanish footballer who played as a defender.

Club career
Canito signed with Basque Country club Athletic Bilbao in 1948, from neighbours Barakaldo CF in the second division. Immediately after arriving, on 12 September, the 17-year-old made his La Liga debut, helping to a 7–2 home demolition of Real Valladolid; in only his tenth appearance he scored his first goal for the Lions, in a 4–0 triumph against Sevilla FC (also at San Mamés).

In the 1955–56 season, Canito appeared in 27 games as Athletic won the top division title, and would also be an essential defensive unit as they conquered three Copa del Rey trophies in just four years (for a total of four during his spell).

After 15 years in the senior squad, and more than 400 official matches, Canito moved to another club in the region, Deportivo Alavés, but called it quits after only a few months. He died aged 67 in his hometown of Barakaldo, Biscay.

International career
On 10 March 1957, Canito won his first and only cap for the Spain national team, as he played the 90 minutes of a 2–2 draw in Madrid against Switzerland for the 1958 FIFA World Cup qualification stage. Neither side would make it to the finals, both trailing group winners Scotland.

Honours
Athletic Bilbao
La Liga: 1955–56
Copa del Generalísimo: 1949–50, 1955, 1956, 1958
Copa Eva Duarte: 1950

External links

1931 births
1998 deaths
Spanish footballers
Footballers from Barakaldo
Association football defenders
Barakaldo CF footballers
Athletic Bilbao footballers
Deportivo Alavés players
Segunda División players
La Liga players
Spain B international footballers
Spain international footballers